"Desert Drought" is the twelfth single by the Liverpool britpop band Cast, fronted by ex La's bassist John Power.

Formats and track listings
CD single (1)
 "Desert Drought"
 "Cobwebs"
 "Desert Drought" (Desert Dry Mouth mix)
 "Desert Drought" (CD-Rom mix)

CD single (2)
 "Desert Drought"
 "Curtains" (Purple Curtains remix)
 "Desert Drought" (Solomon remix)

Personnel
Cast
 John Power – vocals, guitar
 Peter Wilkinson – backing vocals, bass
 Liam "Skin" Tyson – guitar
 Keith O'Neill – drums

Production
 John Power – producer, mixing
 Tristin Norwell – producer, mixing

Chart performance

References

2001 singles
Cast (band) songs
Songs written by John Power (musician)
Polydor Records singles
2001 songs